The Burma zebra danio or KP01 danio is a tropical fish belonging to the minnow family (Cyprinidae).  It is believed to originate in Myanmar. This fish was discovered in 2006 and is believed to be a separate species from the zebra danio (which occurs many miles away in India) to which it has a close resemblance. However, it is more likely to be closely related to the Yoma danio (also from Myanmar), and is believed to be a similar size, 6–9 cm, to the latter.

In the wild, the Burma zebra danio is likely found in rivers in a tropical climate and prefer water with a 6.5 - 7.0 pH, a water hardness of 5.0 - 12.0 dGH, and an ideal temperature range of 75-82 °F (24-28 °C).  The Burma zebra danio is oviparous (an egg layer).

See also
List of freshwater aquarium fish species
Danio
Danionins

External links
Danio sp "KP01"

Danios